The 1994 Symmons Plains ATCC round was the third round of the 1994 Australian Touring Car Championship. It was held on the weekend of 11 to 13 March at Symmons Plains Raceway in Launceston, Tasmania.

Race results

Peter Jackson Dash 
Mark Skaife would win his second Peter Jackson Dash with Glenn Seton in second and Larry Perkins in third.

Race 1 
Skaife once again led off the line with the two Peter Jackson Falcon's following suit. Wayne Gardner was out of the race early due to an oil pressure problem. Alan Jones soon developed a misfire and began to tumble down the pack. The race was otherwise uneventful with Skaife taking another dominant victory to continue his streak of race wins in 1994.

Race 2 
It was another flag-to-flag victory for Mark Skaife as he claimed his sixth straight race win of the season. Close racing throughout the field led to an interesting race. Although, for John Bowe, the race was short lived as he retired from the race with gearbox problems. Tony Longhurst would get his best result of the season with second and Peter Brock in third after a race-long battle with Larry Perkins.

Championship Standings 

Drivers' Championship standings

References

External links 

Symmons Plains